CLOB may refer to:

Character large object, a collection of character data in a database management system
Clabber, a trick-taking card game
CLOB, slang for the drug Methcathinone
Central limit order book, a centralised database of limit orders proposed by the Securities Exchange Commission